Al-Jāmiʿah al-Islāmiyyah al-Yūnusiyyah, also known as Jamia Islamia Yunusia, is one of the Qawmi Jamiahs of Bangladesh located in the neighbourhood of Paikpara in Brahmanbaria. As of 1998, it controlled most of the other madrasahs in Brahmanbaria.

History
It was established by Abu Taher Muhammad Yunus, after whom the Madrasah is named, in 1914 and teacher was Motiur Rahman. Then it was headed by another Deobandi scholar Fakhr-e-Bangal Allamah Tajul Islam and later Shamsul Haque Faridpuri from 1928 to 1935. Five students were killed during the 2001 Fatwa Movement. The current Muhtamim is Mufti Mubarakullah and teacher is Shamsul Haq Saraili.

Alumni
 Azizul Haque, former teacher and student
 Fazlul Haque Amini, former student
 Shamsul Haque Faridpuri, former principal
 Sajidur Rahman, current Shaikul Hadith

References

External links 
 Bangladesh Qawmi Madrasah Education Board

Qawmi madrasas of Bangladesh
Deobandi Islamic universities and colleges
Islamic universities and colleges
1914 establishments in India